Salarabad (also Romanized as Sālārābād) is a village in Howmeh Rural District, in the Central District of Behbahan County, Khuzestan Province, Iran. At the 2006 census, its population was 513, in 89 families.

References 

Populated places in Behbahan County